Bearded lupine is a common name for several flowering plants and may refer to:

Lupinus barbiger, native to Utah and Arizona
Lupinus latifolius var. barbatus, native to California and Oregon